Nordkild is a surname. Notable people with the surname include:

Åge Nordkild (1951–2015), Norwegian politician
Ivar Nordkild (born 1941), Norwegian biathlete